Li Wei (born June 8, 1943) is a Chinese computer scientist and a member of the Chinese Academy of Sciences. In 2002, he became President of Beihang University.

Education
Li graduated from the  Department of Mathematics and Mechanics, Peking University in 1966. He then studied at the University of Edinburgh obtaining a PhD in computer science in 1983 supervised by Gordon Plotkin.

Career
After graduation, he was funded by the EPSRC at Newcastle University and the University of Edinburgh as Senior Programmer. He was also a visiting professor at the Saarland University.
He was elected to the Chinese Academy of Sciences in 1997.

Research interests
Li is mostly engaged in the applied research of Computer Software and Theory and Internet, including programming language, software development, artificial intelligence, and integrated circuit design.

Achievements
Li did some of the first work on structural operational semantics of concurrent programming languages such as Ada and Edison, including a theory of translation between such languages with methods for proving the correctness of translations.

1992, building release logic theory solved the incompleteness of information and fallibility of knowledge and nonmonotonicity of inference.

1998, first advocated research on Data Mining Technology。

References

1943 births
Living people
Alumni of the University of Edinburgh
Chinese computer scientists
Members of the Chinese Academy of Sciences
Peking University alumni
Academic staff of Beihang University
Presidents of Beihang University
Scientists from Beijing